Jean-Claude Brondani (born 2 February 1944) is a French former judoka who competed in the 1972 Summer Olympics.

References

1944 births
Living people
French male judoka
Olympic judoka of France
Judoka at the 1972 Summer Olympics
Olympic bronze medalists for France
Olympic medalists in judo
Medalists at the 1972 Summer Olympics
Universiade medalists in judo
Universiade bronze medalists for France
Medalists at the 1967 Summer Universiade
20th-century French people